Sirkeci is a neighborhood in the Eminönü quarter of the Fatih district in Istanbul, Turkey. In the Byzantine period, the area was known as Prosphorion.

The neighborhood borders to the north the mouth of the Golden Horn, to the west the neighborhood of Bahçekapı, to the east the Topkapı Palace area, and to the south the Cağaloğlu neighborhood. It hosts the Sirkeci railway station, the easternmost terminus of the Orient Express, a historic long-distance passenger train service in Europe that operated between Paris and Istanbul in the period between 1883 and 2009.

The neighborhood consists mostly of commercial and tourist-oriented buildings. A combination of small shops, hans (larger workshops) and offices intermingle with boutique hotels, traditional Turkish restaurants, Turkish and foreign-language bookstores, and tourist offices.

Accommodation

In recent years, Sirkeci has become one of the major hotel neighborhoods in the historical peninsula of Istanbul. With its unique location between the Beyoğlu district and Sultanahmet quarter, Sirkeci hosts many hotels with reasonable pricing options and availability.

Transportation
Famous for its railway station which was the eastern terminus of the Orient Express, Sirkeci remains one of the main travel hubs for Istanbul, connecting suburban train, tram and ferry systems. The Sirkeci Station of the Turkish State Railways is the terminating node of the European railway network leading into Istanbul from Bucharest, Romania. 

Sirkeci is a station on the Marmaray railway line running between Gebze and Halkalı, and connecting the European and Asian sides of Istanbul via a tunnel under the Bosphorus.

See also
 Eminönü
 Sirkeci Terminal
 Marmaray
 Istanbul Metro
 Grand Post Office
 Istanbul Postal Museum

Sources

References 
 

Fatih
Golden Horn
Quarters in Istanbul